Narok East is an electoral constituency in Kenya. It is one of six constituencies of Narok County. The constituency was established for the 2013 elections. Since the 2013 Kenyan General Elections, Hon. Lemanken Aramat has represented the constituency in the Kenyan National Assembly. In 2017, Aramat won re-election as a member of the Jubilee Party.

References

Constituencies in Rift Valley Province
Constituencies in Narok County